Stănculeşti may refer to several villages in Romania:

 Stănculeşti, a village in Bulzeștii de Sus Commune, Hunedoara County
 Stănculeşti, a village in Fârtățești Commune, Vâlcea County

See also 
 Stanca (disambiguation)